Osagyefuo Amoatia Ofori Panin is the 35th Chief of Akyem Abuakwa, also called Okyeman in the Eastern Region of Ghana. He was enstooled on October 4, 1999, to succeed his brother, Osagyefo Kuntukunuku.

October 2019 marked 20 years of his reign, which was celebrated in a glamorous style.

References

People from Eastern Region (Ghana)
Year of birth missing (living people)
Living people
Ghanaian leaders
Ghanaian royalty